Diyllus, probably the son of Phanodemus the Atthidographer (a chronicler of the local history of Athens and Attica), wrote a universal history of the years 357–296 BC.  His work seems to have been a continuation of Ephorus' history, and was itself continued by Psaon of Plataea.  The work was in 26 books, though only fragments survive. Both the historian Diodorus Siculus and the biographer Plutarch valued Diyllus as a competent authority.

References
Felix Jacoby, Die Fragmente der griechischen Historiker, (1923).
Albin Lesky, A History of Greek Literature, (1966).
Oxford Classical Dictionary (1949).
 Christopher Tuplin, "Universal Histories (Hellenica)", in Marincola (ed.) A Companion to Greek and Roman Historiography.

External links
Diyllus: Fragments at attalus.org

Hellenistic-era historians
3rd-century BC historians